Both microcontrollers and microprocessors (including bit-slice processors and DSPs) from the Soviet Union are listed here. Newer devices from Russia, Belarus, and Ukraine are listed here if they are labelled according to the Soviet integrated circuit designation.

References

See also
 List of Russian microprocessors
 Commons:Gallery of Soviet integrated circuits

Soviet
Microprocessor